Carl Alwin Schenck (March 25, 1868 – May 17, 1955) was a German forester and pioneering forestry educator. He founded the Biltmore Forest School, the first forestry school in North America on George W. Vanderbilt's Biltmore Estate. His teachings comprise the foundation of forestry education in the United States. 

The New York Times described him as "the most influential person in making forestry in this country a science and a profession."

Early life
Schenck was born in 1868 in Darmstadt in the state of Hesse, Germany. He was the son of Olga Cornelia Alewyn and Carl Jacob Schenck. In the 17th-century, the Schenck family were goldsmiths in Darmstadt and became leaders of Hesse. However, his grandfather was a chief forester.

He attended the Institute of Technology in Darmstadt, graduating when he was eighteen years old. He studied botany in Darmstadt before enrolling in college. He then attended the University of Tübingen School of Forestry. However, his studies were disrupted when he caught tuberculosis when he was eighteen years old As a result of his illness, he was encouraged by doctors to pursue a career such as a forestry that would provide exposure to fresh air.

In 1888, he enrolled in the forest school of the University of Giessen. There, he studied under visiting professor Sir Dietrich Brandis, considered the world's leading forester at the time. 

In 1890, Schenck became a forest assessor for the state forest service in Hessen. He was required to spend years in such service as part of his degree.In the summers between 1891 and 1894, he worked as an assistant and secretary to foresters Sir Dietrich Brandis and Sir William Schlich. 

He completed his Ph.D. degree in early 1895, summa cum laude. At Giessen, he also passed law examinations.

Career

Biltmore Estate 
After he received his Ph.D., Schenck was recommended by Brandis for a job in the United States working for George W. Vanderbilt in North Carolina. Schenck accepted the job and sailed to America, arriving in New York City on April 5, 1895. He became the third formerly trained forester in the United States.

With the recommendation of Frederick Law Olmsted, Vanderbilt had decided during the early 1890s that he wanted his forests managed using the best scientific principles of forestry. He first hired Gifford Pinchot as the estate's forester. When he arrived at Biltmore, Schenck worked under Pinchot; the latter was transitioning to work for the U.S. Division of Forestry. However, Schenck found that his work crews and the sawmill would only take instruction from Pinchot—because he was a foreigner. Schenck was frustrated, especially because Vanderbilt had said he would be in charge of the daily operations. Letters written between Pinchot and Schenck show his increasing frustration and the growing hostility between the two men.

In September 1895, Pinchot returned to North Carolina and gave Schenck the independence he needed to truly be Biltmore Estate's forester—as long as he finish Pinchot's outstanding projects first. Schenck's first project was in the virgin growth Big Creek area where water was used to transport felled trees because there were few roads. This also meant that he could only harvest tulip poplar trees which could float. Because he had to leave so many other varieties of trees behind, " he spared no tulip poplars to make up for the overall shortfall." His work crew build a temporary splash dam, smoothing Big Creek to create a sluice, ruining the creek for fishing. However, the water strategy used at this location was Pinchot's, not Schenck's. Schenck had no prior experience with dams. When rains came, the logs moved downstream but caused significant damage to other properties, crops, and bridges. 

As a result of this experience, Schenck determined that his methods were better and that American forestry—and Pinchot—was wasteful. He wrote, "As Americans are of the opinion that forestry and tree-planting are the same, I wish to say, that no reasonable forester would plant, where nature regenerates, and where woodlands can be bought at a price per acre, at which planting per acre cannot be done. I repeat, so absurd as it might sound, the disbursements for sylvicultural operations should not be charged to Biltmore Forest, but to 'Sport and Landscape.'" Schenck admitted that he was so disappointed with the program at Biltmore that he nearly resigned from his position. Pinchot blamed Schenck for not letting go of "his German ways."

However, Schenck renewed his contract with Vanderbilt for the next year. By the middle of 1896, he had instituted his distinct version of German forestry, adapted for a forest in North Carolina. He wanted to make Biltmore a sustainable operation. Therefore, he looked for "projects that preserved some of the woods and allowed for natural regeneration as well as plantings." He returned exhausted farms into productive forests, set up firebreaks, established road systems, and created logging and lumbering operations. He also pushed the North Carolina legislature for laws that benefited forestry. Schenck then signed a ten-year contract with Vanderbilt which also provided insurance.

Between 1901 and 1903, Vanderbilt's financial situation changed. In 1903, Vanderbilt cut Schenck's departmental budget by some 50% and told him to borrow the rest from local banks. During 1903 and 1904, Schenck put all efforts toward earning a profit for the estate, including forgoing his usual two-month vacation in Germany. Although he did not earn enough to bail out Biltmore, Schenck did prove his worth to his employer. In 1905 and 1906, when the financial situation looked better, Schenck did borrow from banks, trying to show that his forestry operation could support itself without patronage. This actually worked; however, 1907 brought a financial crisis to the United States.

In March 1908, Schenck wrote Vanderbilt that things looked bad; he needed more operational money, but was reluctant to take out another loan. He also knew Vanderbilt could not increase his budget. Vanderbilt suggested selling some of his Pisgah Forest lands. As this was part of Schenck long term masterpiece which he said from the beginning needed time to see a profit, "the two men squabbled over resources and plans for the future, and their relationship quickly ruptured." Schenck wrote, “I did not make the slightest attempt to find a purchaser for Pisgah Forest. With that sale of Pisgah Forest, my beloved Biltmore Forest School would lose its working field, its demonstration field, its experiment stations, and its very basis.” Schenck raised tuition for his school and tried to sell lumber to raise the needed funds. He also expanded the practice of taking hunting parties into the forest for a fee, signing a $10,000 annual agreement with the Asheville and Chicago Hunting Club while Vanderbilt was in Europe. William Howard Taft was elected president in 1908, announcing in 1909 his desire to make lumber free to all Americans through the National Forest program. This quickly put an end to any hopes for forestry profits at Biltmore.

In March 1909, Schenck got into a disagreement with Charles D. Beadle, general manager of the Biltmore Estate, resulting in Beadle charging him for assault and battery for "boxing his ears." The two had been jockeying for position and funding with Vanderbilt. When the court case came before a justice of the peace in Asheville, Schenk was only fined one dollar. However, since their relationship was already tainted, Vanderbilt used this incident and his annoyance over the private hunting contract to ask Schenck to resign on April 24, 1909.  Schenck stayed with Biltmore through November 1909, the end of his contract. Schenck also sued Vanderbilt for back pay.

Biltmore Forest School 

In 1898, with the permission of Vanderbilt, Schenck founded the Biltmore Forest School, the first forestry school in North America. The Biltmore Forest School provide a one-year course of study, with a curriculum, focused on pairing traditional classroom lectures with extensive hands-on, practical forest management field training. Schenck operated the school in his spare time on the Vanderbilt's lands from 1898 to 1909, turning out many of the leading American foresters of the era.

During the first five years of the school, Schenck's own ideology evolved. Although using his German training, "he began to develop his own ideas about forestry and ultimately fashioned his own new and comprehensive model of forestry for the United States."

Although the Biltmore Forest School was financially self-sustaining, Schenck had to change locations after he left Biltmore in 1909. He continued the school through 1913, traveling with his students and operating from Germany and forest locations in several states in America.

Lecturer and consultant 
As a consultant, Schenck helped create the forestry school curriculum at Sewanee: The University of the South. In 1898, he was also a senior consultant for the United States Division of Forestry, working under Pinchot. He traveled to the deep South's longleaf pine forests several times to conduct surveys. However, this working relationship only lasted four months because of Pinchot and Schenck's divergence in policy and methodology.

From 1916 to 1918, Schenck was a guest lecturer for forestry at the University of Giessen. After World War I, he was a guest speaker at American universities and also led forestry tours in France, Germany, and Switzerland for American and English students. He wrote articles and textbooks during the 1920s and 1930s and was a consultant in locations around the world. From 1923 to 1937, he was visiting professor at the department of forestry of the University of Montana in Missoula.

After World War II, Schenck assisted American officials with relief and forestry programs in Germany. The Americans appointed him chief forester in Hessen. In May 1951, he went on a national lecture tour for the American Forestry Association. He also attended a reunion of Biltmore Forest School alumni. He made his last visit to the United States in 1952 when North Carolina State University gave him an honorary degree.

Publications 
Our Yellow Poplar: Notes and Tables Showing Contents and Value of Poplar Logs and Poplar Trees (1896)
White Pine Timber Supplies (1896)
Guide for an Excursion through Biltmore Forest, on September 17th and 18th, 1897 (1897)
Forestry as Applied to Reservations Used as Parks (1898)
Our Commonwealth and the Necessity of Forest Preservation: Address Delivered at the First Meeting of the North Carolina Forestry Society, at New Bern, N.C., March 2, 1898
Forestry for Kentucky (1899)
In the Woods of Minnesota (1899)
Forestry vs. Lumbering (1900)
Some Business Problems of American Forestry (1900)
The Problem of Forestry in Minnesota (1900)
The Commercial Side of Governmental and Private Forestry (1901)
Financial Results of Forestry at Biltmore (1903)
Lectures on Forest Policy. Second part, Forestry conditions in the United States (1904)
Forest Utilization (1904)
Textbooks of Forestry (1904)
Forest Mensuration (1905)
Biltmore Lectures on Sylviculture (1905)
Forest Management (1907)
Cruisers' Tables Giving the Contents of Sound Trees, and their Dependence on Diameter, Number of Logs in the Tree, Taper of Tree and Efficiency of Mill.
Forest Finance (1909)
Forest Protection: Guide to Lectures Delivered at the Biltmore Forest School. (1909)
Forest Policy (1911)
Logging and Lumbering; or, Forest Utilization. A Textbook for Forest Schools (1912)
The Art of the Second Growth, Or American Sylviculture (1912)
Forest Utilization in Europe (1924)'
Precarious Situation in World's Spruce Wood Supply (1930)
Forestry in Germany (1948)
The Biltmore Immortals: Biographies of 50 American Boys Graduating from the Biltmore Forest School which was the First School of American Forestry on American Soil · Volume 1 (1950).
The Cavalcade of Trees for the Great: Being the Tour of Carl Alwin Schenck in America (1951)
The Dawn of Private Forestry in America, Recollections of a Forester Covering the Years 1895 to 1914 (1915, 1955)
The Biltmore Story: Recollections of the Beginning of Forestry in the United States (1955)
The Forestry Interests of the South (n.d.)

Honors 

 Schenck was presented with a ceremonial sword used for deer hunting by the German state of Hessen when he retired in 1939.
 A plaque was placed at the Biltmore Forest School site in his honor in 1950 by alumni of the school. The plaque reads, “In memory of Carl Alwin Schenck, 1867-1955. This memorial forest is dedicated to honor a great teacher and founder of the Biltmore Forest School, the first school of forestry in the new world. His ashes have been spread here among the trees he loved.”
 A redwood grove at Prairie Creek Redwoods State Park, near Orrick, California, was purchased and dedicated in his honor in 1951.
 A long leaf pin plantation near Aiken, South Carolina was named in his honor in 1951.
 In 1951, a 200,000-acre tree farm at Coos Bay, Oregon was named in his honor.
 In 1952, North Carolina State University awarded Schenck with an honorary Doctor of Forest Science.
 Named in his honor, the Carl Alwin Schenck Memorial Forest, a 245-acre forest in Wake County, North Carolina that is maintained by North Carolina State University as a teaching and research forest.
 North Carolina State University's Carl Alwin Schenck Distinguished Professorship of Forest Management was established in his honor.
 Biltmore Forest School alumni endowed four scholarships in his honor at North Carolina State University.
 Annually, the Society of American Foresters gives its Carl Alwin Schenck Award for outstanding performance in forestry education.
 In 2015 the Forest History Society funded an Emmy Award-winning documentary about Schenck, America's First Forest: Carl Schenck and the Asheville Experiment.

Legacy 
Schenck became one of the most influential people in the field of forestry in the United States, and he trained many of the next generation of leadership in the field. He also invented the Biltmore Stick which is still used today to measure tree heights and diameters. In addition, Schenck had his students develop the tools and tables that were used by the federal government.

However, Schenck's name was written out of the history of forestry, in part, because he was German during an era when the United States fought two wars against Germany. Pinchot wrote, "We in the Division of Forestry fully recognized the necessity for professional education in Forestry in this country, but we had small confidence in the leadership of Dr. Fernow and Dr. Schenck. We distrusted them and their German lack of faith in American Forestry. What we wanted was American foresters trained by Americans in American ways for the work ahead in American forests." After meeting Schenck, President Theodore Roosevelt said, “Nobody has a right to work here for so long without becoming a citizen of the United States!"

Pinchot and Schenck also had differing ideas as to how to manage forests, with the former preferring public lands and the latter preferring private lands. As modern historian notes, "Though the two shared the common goal of popularizing forestry in the United States, their means of meeting that goal conflicted as much as their definition of forestry." Because Pinchot was in charge of the Forest Service, he vision dominated and shaped modern forestry in the United States. However modern historians have found that Schenck's role was greater than what had been depicted in the historical narrative.

Personal 
In 1896, Schenck married Adele Bopp (1874-1929) of Darmstadt, Germany. The couple had no children. However, he became the legal guardian of his niece, Olli von Rhoeneck, after her father died in World War I. In 1932, he married widow Marie Louise Faber (1869-1950). 

After the Biltmore Forest School closed in 1913, Schenck returned to Germany. Through his family, he was given land in Lindenfels. There, he built a home from species of trees he encountered in the United States. 

When World War I began, he joined the German army as a quartermaster and served as a lieutenant on the Eastern front. In Poland, he was shot in the stomach by a Russian soldier and was taken to a Russian prisoner of war camp. After the war, the economy in Lindenfels was poor. To feed starving German children, he worked with the American Society of Friends (aka Quakers). Schenck felt betrayed by the German government and withdrew from political work, trying to survive on a small pension. Former students also helped to support him. However, Schenck "felt no reason to apologize for serving his homeland in its time of need."

During World War II he stayed in Lindenfels and taught local boys when the schools closed. He also shared care packages that were mailed to him by Biltmore Forest School alumni with his students. After the war, he spent ten years fighting the United States in court to reclaim money and property that was confiscated in the war. However, he was unsuccessful in this Alien Property Custody Suit, despite the efforts of his former students on his behalf.

Schenck died in Lindenfels in 1955, at the age of 87 after an extended illness. At his request, his funeral was held in Germany, but his ashes were spread at the Schenck Forest in North Carolina.

References

Further reading 
 Schenck, Carl Alwin,  Cradle of Forestry in America: The Biltmore Forest School introduction by Steven Anderson (1998) ISBN 9780890300558

1868 births
1955 deaths
People from Darmstadt-Dieburg
Technische Universität Darmstadt alumni
University of Giessen alumni
History of forestry in the United States
History of forestry education
German foresters
American foresters
Biltmore Forest School
Commanders Crosses of the Order of Merit of the Federal Republic of Germany
University of Montana faculty
Forestry academics